Memoirs of a French Whore (French: La Dérobade) is a French film released in 1979.  It was directed by Daniel Duval.  It stars Miou-Miou, Maria Schneider and Niels Arestrup.

Plot
Marie is 19 and is bored in her little suburban life with no future. In a café, she meets Gérard, a beautiful brown frimeur and voluble, who has no trouble seducing. Blinded by love, too candid, Mary decides to leave her parents and her clerk job to live with the man she considers as the love of her life. But Gerard is a pimp, who soon forces her into prostitution. By "home visit" first, in the street or in the Bois de Boulogne then, the young woman gradually discovers a world of decay and violence.

Cast
 Miou-Miou as Marie
 Daniel Duval as Gérard
 Maria Schneider as Maloup
 Niels Arestrup as André
 Jean Benguigui as Jean-Jean
 Martine Ferrière as Madame Pedro
 Brigitte Ariel as Odette
 Marie Pillet as Lulu
 Régis Porte as François
 Isabelle Mergault as a Prostitute
 Jean-Claude Dreyfus
 Brigitte Sy

References

External links

1979 drama films
1979 films
French drama films
1970s French-language films
Films about prostitution in Paris
Films scored by Vladimir Cosma
Films featuring a Best Actress César Award-winning performance
1970s French films